Dalbasan is a village in the Yayladere District, Bingöl Province, Turkey. The village is populated by Kurds of the Kurêşan and Seter tribes and had a population of 91 in 2021.

Tha hamlets of Kutluca and Yukarıseter are attached to the village.

References 

Villages in Yayladere District
Kurdish settlements in Bingöl Province